Evergreen Acres is a historic home and farm complex located at Cazenovia in Madison County, New York.  The frame farmhouse was built about 1814 in the Federal style and enlarged and altered about 1860. Also on the property are a barn, carriage house, two corn cribs, a silo, and two hen houses.

It was added to the National Register of Historic Places in 1987.

References

Houses on the National Register of Historic Places in New York (state)
Federal architecture in New York (state)
Houses in Madison County, New York
National Register of Historic Places in Cazenovia, New York